The House of Ranjina, known as Ragnina in Italian, was a noble family in the Republic of Ragusa.

History 
The family traced its origins from Taranto, Italy.

Members
Nićifor Ranjina (fl. 1319), built the Minčeta Tower in 1319, originally as a strong four-sided fort.
Nikša Ranjina (1494–1582), writer most famous as the compiler of Ranjina's Miscellany
Dinko Ranjina (1536–1607), poet

See also 
Croatian nobility

References

Ragusan noble families
Italians of Croatia